Michael Francis McCluskey (April 30, 1899 – 1977) was a Canadian politician. He served in the Legislative Assembly of New Brunswick as member of the Liberal party from 1944 to 1952.

References

1899 births
1977 deaths
20th-century Canadian politicians
New Brunswick Liberal Association MLAs
People from Grand Falls, New Brunswick